Zinedine Zidane Moisés Catraio (born 17 June 1998), commonly known as Zinedine Catraio, is an Angolan footballer who currently plays as a midfielder for 1º de Agosto.

Career statistics

Club

Notes

International

References

1998 births
Living people
Angolan footballers
Angola international footballers
Association football midfielders
C.D. Primeiro de Agosto players
Girabola players